Static trapeze, also known as fixed trapeze, is a type of circus art performed on the trapeze.  In contrast to the other forms of trapeze, on static trapeze the bars and ropes mainly stay in place.

The ropes are at least two human lengths, as many figures are performed on the ropes above the bar. The ropes can be made of many materials, including cotton or hemp, and often have a wire woven inside.
It can be performed by a single artist or two partners working together. A single artist will do tricks above and below the bar, the ropes playing just as important a part as the bar. A partner act will involve the partners working together — supporting each other's weight, throwing, lifting and catching each other. 

Self-standing trapezes can be purchased for home use.

Multiple trapeze is an act entailing the use of more than one trapeze, typically two or three. In these acts, multiple people perform simultaneously.
The most common type of multiple trapeze is a "triple trapeze". A triple trapeze has one long bar, held up by ropes, basically three trapezes put together, with the middle trapeze sharing the ropes of the other two. Multiple trapeze can also refer to an abstract structure with trapeze like structures, inside which multiple artists may perform.

A triple trapeze is a type of static (still) trapeze with three trapezes on one bar. Therefore, there are four ropes connecting this trapeze to its frame, or whatever it is hanging from. Performers specialize in synchronized tricks. One example of a triple trapeze act can be seen in Cirque du Soleil's show Varekai. An experimental cage-like structure was created for the show, but was ultimately scrapped in production. However, the structure did appear in the 'making of' documentary Fire Within.

Repertoire
 
Static trapeze routines are choreographed from a number of standard tricks, movements, and positions, including:

 sitting - generally used to describe sitting on the bar, with your shoulders parallel to the bar, with both legs in front of the bar
 full beats - hanging from the bar with your hands, keeping legs straight and together, bringing feet up to level with the bar and then swinging down, through vertical and back with feet returning up to the level of the bar
 knee beats - hanging from the knees, bringing hands up above the level of the bar, then straightening the body, swinging backward down through the vertical, and back with hands returning above the level of the bar
 catcher's lock (or catches) - hanging upside down, with the bar across the front of the thighs, and the ropes passing inside the bent knees. This is generally a strong position to catch or hold another person (hence the name).
 bird's nest - belly down, arched backward, tops of the feet one on each rope above the hands, with hands still on the bar
 mermaid - similar to bird's nest but both feet on the same rope
 bird's nest in ropes - belly down, arched backward with tops of the feet one on each rope, above the hands also in the ropes (see picture)
 mermaid in ropes - similar to bird's nest in the ropes but both feet on the same rope
 angel - similar to mermaid, except one leg is released from the ropes to allow the body to face upward
 gazelle - sideways on the bar, one leg straight across the bar with the ankle past the velvet, one leg bent with the rope passing between the knee and the body which hangs backward down beneath the bar
 coffin - lying straight and horizontal with one shoulder on one velvet, and the feet on the other velvet
 candlestick - hanging from one knee over the bar, with the other flexed foot wrapped anticlockwise (from below) in the rope
 knee hang - hanging from the bar with the backs of the knees
 ankle hang - hanging with the bar behind both ankles and one foot in each velvet with the velvet in the instep
 toe hang - hanging from the bar with the tops of your feet (not normally the toes)
 neck hang - hanging from the bar by tilting your head backward to rest the bar on the back of your neck
 around the world - from sitting, one hand in the rope above the head, the other on the bar by that rope, lifting the body and rotating around the rope and returning to sit
 one-arm hang - simply hanging from one arm, usually with a strong rather than collapsed shoulder
 flag - from sitting or front balance, holding a rope in one hand, the bar in vertical position in the other hand, with rope passing under that elbow
 Russian rolls - from front balance, tipping forward and grabbing the thighs and then releasing and allowing the roll to carry you back to front balance
 windmill - from a sitting position with one leg in front and one behind the bar, both hands on the bar, then tipping forward and rotating to return to the starting position
 splits under the bar - hanging inverted beneath the bar, both hands on the bar, the splits with one leg in front and one behind
 straddle - hanging inverted beneath the bar, both hands on the middle of the bar, with legs straddled and horizontal over the head but beneath the bar
 pike - hanging inverted beneath the bar, both hands on the sides of the bar, with legs piked and horizontal over the head but beneath the bar
 star (or splits) in the ropes - standing with one foot on each rope, and one hand on each rope
 star on the bar - similar to back balance, but with the legs straddled to catch the ropes, and head tipped downward
 amazon - lower arm straight downward, hand holding the bar out to one side, trapping the rope with neck and the other shoulder
 amazon pirouette - starting in amazon, reaching up to hold the rope with the free hand then that toe reaching around backward to reach the bar
 belly (or front) balance - lying horizontal, with the bar across the front of your waist/hips
 back balance - lying horizontal, with the bar across the back of your waist
 one-legged monkey roll - from splits below the bar, hooking one knee on, then wrapping arms in the velvets with the inner elbow resting under the bar, then rotating backward to sit with one leg left behind the bar in the sitting position
 monkey roll - from pike beneath the bar, hooking both knees on, then wrapping arms in the velvets with the inner elbow resting under the bar, then rotating backward to sit
 roll up - usually from sit to stand, holding the ropes above your head, lifting and rolling over backward
 roll down - usually from stand to sit - holding the ropes at the waist, tipping forward, and rolling forward
 knee wrap - from catches, rotating forward through the space between the ropes one or more complete wraps
 knee balance - kneeling on the bar, not holding on 
 planche - usually with hands behind the back, belly downward, body holding a horizontal plank position
 back or side planche - similar to a planche with the body holding a horizontal position, belly in a lateral position, usually with one arm holding on behind the back
 meathook - similar to a side planche but with the one arm in front of the body and a piked body position
 toysoldier - a repeating sequence combining crucifix, beat and front balance
 crucifix - bar across the back of the shoulders, ropes under the armpits
 inverted crucifix - inverted body position, with bar across top of shoulders, usually with feet in the ropes
 handstand on the bar - usually with feet in the ropes
 layout in the ropes - from standing, a side planche in the ropes keeping the bar on your feet
 crescent moon - one leg in the ropes, one on the bar, facing the leg in the ropes and holding that rope with both hands before rotating the bar around the body to wrap the bottom foot and release the hands
 standing - generally used to describe standing facing with your shoulders parallel to the bar
 lampost - standing on the bar with the back to one rope, with the rope passing along the side of the neck, hands free
 skinning the cat  - from pike position fully rotating body toward the feet downward, then returning to the pike position
 skinning the cat with a dislocation - from the fully rotated skinners position releasing one hand and returning to hanging below the bar
 pullover - a transition from hanging into front balance, lifting feet gradually up and over the bar

See also
 Cradle (circus act)

External links
 Aerial Arts FAQ (Simply Circus)
 TrapezeRigging.com - a seller of trapeze equipment
 THE Flying Trapeze Resource Page
 Circus Arts Institute - author and seller of the Aerial Circus Training and Safety Manual

Circus skills
Performing arts